Maserada sul Piave is a comune (municipality) in the Province of Treviso in the Italian region Veneto, located about  north of Venice and about  northeast of Treviso.

Maserada sul Piave borders the following municipalities: Breda di Piave, Carbonera, Cimadolmo, Ormelle, Ponte di Piave, Spresiano.

References

External links
 www.comuneweb.it/MaseradaHome/

Cities and towns in Veneto